Walter M. Simonds (January 31, 1911 - December 11, 1992) was an American art director. He was nominated for an Academy Award in the category Best Art Direction for the film Marty.

Selected filmography
 Marty (1955)

References

External links

1911 births
1992 deaths
American art directors